Book of Victory may refer to:

 Zafarnama, a title for a number of Persian and Turkish texts which literally means "Book of Victory"
 Sefer Nizzahon Yashan ("The (Old) Book of Victory"), an anonymous 13th century Jewish apologetic
 Sefer Nizzahon (ספר ניצחון), a Jewish work of apologetics written by Yom-Tov Lipmann-Muhlhausen around 1405